Mali participated at the 2018 Summer Youth Olympics in Buenos Aires, Argentina from 6 October to 18 October 2018.

Competitors

Athletics

Swimming

Taekwondo

 Girls' 63 kg

References

2018 in Malian sport
Nations at the 2018 Summer Youth Olympics
Mali at the Youth Olympics